John Otis (August 3, 1801 – October 17, 1856) was a U.S. Representative from Maine.

Born in Leeds, Massachusetts (now in Maine), Otis attended the common schools, and was graduated from Bowdoin College, Brunswick, Maine, in 1823.
He studied law. He was admitted to the bar and commenced practice in Hallowell, Maine, in 1826. He served as member of the State House of Representatives in 1841. He was appointed a member of the Northeastern Boundary Commission in 1842. He served in the State Senate in 1842. He was again a member of the State House of Representatives in 1846 and 1847. He was elected as a Whig to the 31st United States Congress (March 4, 1849 – March 3, 1851). He died in Hallowell, Maine, October 17, 1856. He was interred in Hallowell Cemetery.

References

1801 births
1856 deaths
Bowdoin College alumni
Maine state senators
Members of the Maine House of Representatives
Otis family
People from Leeds, Maine
Maine lawyers
Whig Party members of the United States House of Representatives from Maine
19th-century American politicians
19th-century American lawyers
19th-century American businesspeople